Parkhead railway station can refer to one of several passenger (or passengers and goods) railway stations in the Parkhead area of Glasgow, Scotland:

Those with Parkhead in the station name 
 The ex-NBR Parkhead station, subsequently renamed Parkhead North railway station (closed)
 The ex-Cal Parkhead station, subsequently renamed Parkhead Stadium railway station (closed) 
 Parkhead Forge Siding (closed)

Those without Parkhead in the station name 
 Alexandra Parade railway station
 Bridgeton railway station
 Bridgeton Goods (closed) 
 Camlachie Goods (closed)
 Dalmarnock railway station
 Duke Street railway station
 Haghill Goods (closed) 
 Kennyhill Goods (closed) 
 London Road Goods (closed)

Railway stations in Glasgow
SPT railway stations
Disused railway stations in Glasgow
Parkhead